Katyar Kaljat Ghusali (A dagger through the heart) may refer to:

 Katyar Kaljat Ghusali (play), 1967
 Katyar Kaljat Ghusali (film), 2015